The 1989 Campeonato Argentino de Rugby (Campionato argentino de Mayores) was won for the third consecutive year by the selection of Unión de Rugby de Tucumàn that beat in the final the selection of Rosario.

Rugby Union in Argentina in 1989

National
 The Buenos Aires Champsionship was won by Alumni and  Banco Nación
 The Cordoba Province Championship was won by Tala
 The North-East Championship was won by Tucumán RC
 The selection of Buenos Aires. Won the "Juvenil" (Under-21) championship.

International
 The Italy national rugby union team, visited South America for the first time, lost honorably against "Pumas" (16-21). 

 The Argentine national team visited New Zealand, obtained two heavy loss in the test match (9-60) and (12-49).

"Campeonato"  Tournament 
The better eight teams played for the title. They were divided into two pools of four, the first two of each pools admitted to semifinals, the last relegated to the secondo division

Pool A 

{| class="wikitable" 
!rowspan=2 width="8%"| Place
!rowspan=2 width="20%"| Team
!colspan=4 width="32%"| Games
!colspan=3 width="30%"| Points
!rowspan=2 width="10%"| Tablepoints
|-
!width="8%"| played 
!width="8%"| won 
!width="8%"| drawn 
!width="8%"| lost 
!width="10%"| for 
!width="10%"| against 
!width="10%"| diff.
|- align=center style="background: #ccffcc;"
|1||align=left|Tucumàn||3||3||0||0||101||60||41||6
|- align=center style="background: #ccffcc;"
|2||align=left|Córdoba||3||1||1||1||90||64||26||3
|- align=center style="background: #ffffff;"
|3||align=left|Entre Rios||3||1||1||1||42||53||-11||3
|- align=center style="background: #ffdddd;"
|4||align=left|Santiago del estero||3||0||0||3||42||98||-56||0|}

 Pool B 

 Semifinals 

3rd place final

 Final Tucumàn 15. F. Williams, 14. J. Soler, 13. J. Gianotti, 12. S. Mesón, 11. G. Terán, 10. R. Sauze, 9. P. Merlo (capt.), 8. J. Santamarina, 7. S. Bunader, 6. P. Garretón, 5. O. Fascioli (Macome 77'), 4. P. Buabse, 3. L. Molina (R. Paz Posse 57'), 2. S. Paz Posse, 1. R. Hortas.
 Rosario: 15. Del Castillo, 14. Sarrabayrousse, 13. Paván, 12. Romero Acuña, 11. García, 10. Ansaldi, 9. Crexell, 8.P. Baraldi, 7. Schnaider, 6. Pérez, 5. Minoldo (Rossi), 4. Discaciatti (capt.), 3. Céspedes, 2. M. Baraldi, 1. Mansilla.
 Champion: Tucumán
 Relegated:''' San Juan and Santiago del estero

 "Classificacion" Tournament 
Teams are divided in two pools: the winners of each, promoted to "Campeonato" tournament.

 Pool "C" 

Promoted: Mar del Plata

 Pool "D" 

The match between Noreste and Misiones wasn't played.

Promoted: Santa Fè

 External links 
 Memorias de la UAR 1989
  Francesco Volpe, Paolo Pacitti (Author), Rugby 2000'', GTE Gruppo Editorale (1999)

Campeonato Argentino de Rugby
Argentina